Ames Township is one of the fourteen townships of Athens County, Ohio, United States. The 2010 census found 1,183 people in the township, 1,029 of whom lived in the unincorporated portions of the township.

Geography
Located in the northern part of the county, it borders the following townships:
Homer Township, Morgan County - north
Marion Township, Morgan County - northeast corner
Bern Township - east
Rome Township - southeast corner
Canaan Township - south
Athens Township - southwest corner
Dover Township - west
Trimble Township - northwest corner

The village of Amesville is located in eastern Ames Township.

Name and history
Ames Township was organized in 1802.

It is the only Ames Township statewide.

Government
The township is governed by a three-member board of trustees, who are elected in November of odd-numbered years to a four-year term beginning on the following January 1. Two are elected in the year after the presidential election and one is elected in the year before it. There is also an elected township fiscal officer, who serves a four-year term beginning on April 1 of the year after the election, which is held in November of the year before the presidential election. Vacancies in the fiscal officership or on the board of trustees are filled by the remaining trustees.

References

External links
County website

Townships in Athens County, Ohio
1802 establishments in the Northwest Territory
Townships in Ohio